William Kiprop Komen (died 22 June 2019) was a Kenyan KANU politician who served as a Member of Parliament for Rongai, Nakuru Town, and the former Nakuru West Constituency.

Political career 
In 1969, Komen was elected aged 24 as MP of Nakuru West, now forming the constituencies of Njoro, Molo, Kuresoi South and Kuresoi North. He lost this seat in the 1974 general election. In 1975, he won a by-election for the Nakuru Town seat, and held this seat until the 1979 election. Then, in 1992, he became MP for Rongai until 1997.

Personal life 
Komen was born to Joseph Kibowen Komen and Talai Tapsarga Komen of Njoro, Nakuru. He had four wives. James Murgor, MP for Keiyo North, was also his brother-in-law. Komen had eleven children;Peter Komen, the late David Komen, John "Boss" Komen, Richie Komen, Chris Komen  among them is Raymond Komen, who is also a politician.

Komen was a devout Catholic.

On 22 June 2019, Komen died aged 77.

References

2019 deaths
Kenyan politicians
Year of birth missing
Kenyan Roman Catholics